Wache Dzong is a dzong in Bjena Gewog in Wangdue Phodrang, Bhutan. The dzong was built in the 13th century by descendants of Sangdag Garton, son of Phajo Drugum Zhigpo. Reconstruction works for the dzong was started in 2011 by Khenpo Dorji and was later consecrated by the Je Khenpo on 7 January 2015.

In 2012, Wachen Dzong was included in Bhutan's tentative list for inscription on the UNESCO World Heritage List.

References

Dzongs in Bhutan
Buddhist monasteries in Bhutan
Tibetan Buddhism in Bhutan
Wangdue Phodrang District